Luís Fernando Gonçalves Fernandes Tinoco (born 17 October 1986) is a Portuguese footballer who plays for Santa Maria F.C. as a left back.

Club career
Born in Barcelos, Tinoco reached local Gil Vicente FC's youth system at the age of only 10. He appeared in four Primeira Liga games towards the end of the 2004–05 season, but went on to spend the following years on loan to amateur clubs, being released from contract in 2008 and joining another lower-league side, Italy's S.S. Monopoli 1966.

In the summer of 2010, Tinoco returned to his country's top division, but only featured once in the league with S.C. Beira-Mar, being loaned twice to teams in the Segunda Liga. For the 2012–13 campaign he signed with another club in the latter tier, Associação Naval 1º de Maio.

Following Naval's relegation to division three due to irregularities, Tinoco moved to newly promoted F.C. Arouca in late June 2013. He was presented the following month alongside Rui Sacramento.

On 24 June 2015, after being relatively played during his stint, Tinoco signed a one-year deal with C.D. Tondela.

References

External links

1986 births
Living people
People from Barcelos, Portugal
Sportspeople from Braga District
Portuguese footballers
Association football defenders
Primeira Liga players
Liga Portugal 2 players
Segunda Divisão players
Gil Vicente F.C. players
SC Vianense players
S.C. Beira-Mar players
Moreirense F.C. players
G.D. Estoril Praia players
Associação Naval 1º de Maio players
F.C. Arouca players
C.D. Tondela players
C.F. União players
AD Oliveirense players
F.C. Felgueiras 1932 players
Santa Maria F.C. players
S.S. Monopoli 1966 players
Portuguese expatriate footballers
Expatriate footballers in Italy
Portuguese expatriate sportspeople in Italy